Nimon Lokaj(born 7 December 1941 in Pobrde, near Deçan, Kingdom of Albania) is an Albanian painter. He graduated from the Academy of Fine Arts of Belgrade in 1969. After graduating taught figurative art in Deçan. His works have been widely exhibited in Kosovo, Yugoslavia and the rest of Europe during the 1970s and the 1980s. Currently he is a member of the Academy of Figurative Arts of Kosovo.

Awards

Sources 

Albanian painters
1941 births
Living people
Kosovan painters